Cosmi Americo & Figlio is an Italian shotgun manufacturer located in Ancona, Italy. The company manufactures semi-automatic shotguns under the name Cosmi. Only approximately 7,500 guns have been manufactured since 1930, and individual guns are unique enough that parts are often not interchangeable. Each part is individually serial numbered. The shotgun is available in three calibers: 12, 16 and 20.

References

External links 
 Official Website

Firearm manufacturers of Italy
Manufacturing companies established in 1890
Italian companies established in 1890
Italian brands